Vechrik is a rural locality (a selo) in Kurkaksky Selsoviet, Tabasaransky District, Republic of Dagestan, Russia. The population was 292 as of 2010.

Geography 
Vechrik is located 7 km south of Khuchni (the district's administrative centre) by road. Dzhugdil is the nearest rural locality.

References 

Rural localities in Tabasaransky District